Yezdochnoye is a rural locality (a selo) in Ternovskoye Rural Settlement, Ostrogozhsky District, Voronezh Oblast, Russia. The population was 164 as of 2010. There are 2 streets.

Geography 
Yezdochnoye is located 23 km northwest of Ostrogozhsk (the district's administrative centre) by road. Soldatskoye is the nearest rural locality.

References 

Rural localities in Ostrogozhsky District